Centre Hill Museum or Centre Hill Mansion as its proper name, completed initial construction in 1823 and was built by Revolutionary War veteran Robert Bolling IV. The Bollings were a very prominent family for many generations, being granted a plot of land in present-day Petersburg by the then King of England. Centre Hill served as Union headquarters during the reconstruction period; therefore, a meeting between a Union general and President Lincoln took place inside the home in 1865. President Taft also spent time on the property. Its doors were opened as a museum in the 1950s.

History
The mansion was built in 1823 by Robert Bolling IV, who had served in the Revolutionary Army. An extensive remodeling was undertaken by Robert Buckner Bolling in the 1840s. It is a two-story, five bay, transitional Greek Revival style brick dwelling.  An east wing was added about 1850.  The front facade features a has a flat-roofed five-bay verandah supported by six Greek Ionic order columns.

It was listed on the National Register of Historic Places in 1972.  It is located in the Centre Hill Historic District.

Today the house encompasses three American architectural styles. The mansion's South Facade is dominated by a Greek Revival-style porch with ionic columns. Greek Revival architectural ornamentation is a feature of the interior, along with elements of early Federal style and later Colonial Revival style.

The 1840s renovation also included construction of a tunnel from the back of the house to nearby Henry Street. Slaves used the tunnel to carry food in and out of the house.

Notable events
President Abraham Lincoln spoke to Union soldiers occupying the mansion during a trip to Petersburg in April 1865. President William Howard Taft was a guest in May 1909.

The mansion was used as a set in the made-for-TV movie Killing Lincoln.

The mansion was also used as the set of the Green family home  in the PBS drama Mercy Street (TV series).

Legends
Every January 24, the ghosts of American Civil War soldiers are said to march up the stairs at 7:30 p.m. Twenty minutes later, the specters march back down the stairs and leave, slamming the front door behind them.

Neighbors also have reported seeing a Lady in White standing at an upstairs window.

The museum hosts a "Ghost Watch" on January 24 each year.

References

External links
 Centre Hill Museum – City of Petersburg site
Center Hill, Franklin Street, Petersburg, Petersburg, VA: 2 photos at Historic American Buildings Survey

Houses in Petersburg, Virginia
Historic house museums in Virginia
History museums in Virginia
Museums in Petersburg, Virginia
Houses on the National Register of Historic Places in Virginia
Greek Revival houses in Virginia
Houses completed in 1823
National Register of Historic Places in Petersburg, Virginia
Individually listed contributing properties to historic districts on the National Register in Virginia